Piggly Wiggly is an American supermarket chain operating in the American Southern and Midwestern regions run by Piggly Wiggly, LLC, an affiliate of C&S Wholesale Grocers. Its first outlet opened in 1916 in Memphis, Tennessee, and is notable for having been the first true self-service grocery store, and the originator of various familiar supermarket features such as checkout stands, individual item price marking and shopping carts. The current company headquarters is in Keene, New Hampshire. A total of 499 independently owned Piggly Wiggly stores currently operate across 18 states, primarily in smaller cities and towns.

History

Piggly Wiggly was the first self-service grocery store. It was founded on September 6, 1916 (although it did not open until five days later due to delays in construction), at 79 Jefferson Avenue in Memphis, Tennessee, by Clarence Saunders. A replica of the original store has been constructed in the Memphis Pink Palace Museum and Planetarium, a mansion that Saunders built as his private residence, which was later sold to the city.

At the time of its founding, grocery stores did not allow customers to gather their goods. Instead, a customer would give a list of items to a clerk, who would then collect them throughout the store. This created greater costs and higher prices. Piggly Wiggly introduced the innovation of allowing customers to go through the store, gathering their goods, thus cutting costs and lowering prices. Losses due to easier shoplifting were more than offset by profits from increased impulse purchasing. Others were initially experimenting with this format, which came to be known as a "groceteria", reminding people of cafeterias, another relatively new, self-service idea.

Piggly Wiggly Corporation secured the self-service format and issued franchises to hundreds of grocery retailers to operate its stores. The concept of the "self-serving store" was patented by Saunders in 1917. Customers at Piggly Wiggly entered the store through a turnstile and walked through four aisles to view the 605 items sold in packages and organized into departments. The customers selected merchandise as they continued through the maze to the cashier. Instantly, packaging and brand recognition became important to companies and consumers alike.

In 1937, Piggly Wiggly became the first company to provide shopping carts for customers, in their Oklahoma branch; they were also the first company to use Point of sale lanes for payment.

The success of Piggly Wiggly was phenomenal, and other independent and chain grocery stores changed to self-service in the 1920s and 1930s. At its peak in 1932 (see Clarence Saunders), the company operated 2,660 stores and posted annual sales in excess of $180 million. In November 1922, Saunders attempted a squeeze on the substantial short interest in the stock, running the share price up from 40 to 120 and profiting by millions on paper. The Stock Exchange Governors responded by deciding that a corner had been established in Piggly Wiggly and removed the stock from the Board, eventually forcing Saunders to turn over his assets to the banks that had financed his leveraged position. Saunders reputedly lost $9 million in the attempted corner.

Following these events, the company was divided into strategic units and sold to regional grocery chains, including Kroger, Safeway, National Tea, and Colonial. In 1935, all 179 Canadian Piggly Wiggly were also sold to Canada Safeway, which merged with Sobeys in 2013.

After losing control of Piggly Wiggly, Saunders had no further association with the company. However, he remained interested in automated shopping, with which he experimented initially with the Keedoozle store until he died in 1953.

According to John Brooks, Piggly Wiggly's "greatly changed corporate structure...flourished into the 1960s," and hundreds of stores "operated under a franchise agreement with the Piggly Wiggly Corporation, of Jacksonville, Florida.

Name
According to the Piggly Wiggly web site, Saunders was "reluctant" to explain the origin of the company's name. There are two theories: One story says that, while riding a train, he looked out his window and saw several little pigs struggling to get under a fence, which prompted him to think of the rhyme. Someone once asked him why he had chosen such an unusual name for his organization, to which he replied, "So people will ask that very question."

Present company
Piggly Wiggly was acquired by the wholesale grocer Malone & Hyde in 1982. Malone & Hyde was acquired by Fleming Companies in 1988. Fleming filed for bankruptcy in 2003, and C&S Wholesale Grocers acquired most of the business, including Piggly Wiggly. C&S acquired regional warehouses Piggly Wiggly Carolina in 2013 and Piggly Wiggly Midwest in 2021.

There are more than 600 independently owned and operated stores in 17 states. The company headquarters is located in Keene, New Hampshire.
Some of the stores in Alabama have formed Piggly Wiggly Alabama Distributing Company, a retailers' cooperative to manage distribution while using the Piggly Wiggly name. Piggly Wiggly stores are found predominantly in medium to smaller cities and remain a fixture in many rural communities. In many of the larger cities and more metropolitan areas within the company's territory (especially in the faster-growing regions), competitive national grocery chains have built larger supermarkets with greater variety and selection than Piggly Wiggly, targeting a more upscale clientele. In response, Piggly Wiggly was among the first to develop a loyalty card discount membership program similar to many other national merchants.

See also
 Supermarkets in the United States
 Houchens Industries

References

Further reading
 Mike Freeman, Clarence Saunders and the Founding of Piggly Wiggly:  The Rise & Fall of a Memphis Maverick (2011) on Google Books

External links

 Official website
 North Carolina and Virginia stores
 North Carolina, West Virginia, Virginia, and Ohio stores
 South Carolina stores
 Louisiana stores
 Illinois and Wisconsin stores
 Pink Palace Museum exhibit

History of Memphis, Tennessee
Companies based in Cheshire County, New Hampshire
Supermarkets of the United States
Economy of the Midwestern United States
Economy of the Southeastern United States
Retail companies established in 1916
Companies that filed for Chapter 11 bankruptcy in 1922
Companies that filed for Chapter 11 bankruptcy in 2003
Franchises
Fictional pigs
1916 establishments in Tennessee